Zarakolu is a Turkish surname. Notable people with the surname include:

 Ayşe Nur Zarakolu (1946–2002), Turkish author, publisher, and human rights activist
 Deniz Zarakolu, Turkish activist
 Ragıp Zarakolu (born 1948), Turkish human rights activist

Turkish-language surnames